Events in the year 2022 in Samoa.

Incumbents 

 O le Ao o le Malo: Va'aletoa Sualauvi II
 Prime Minister: Fiamē Naomi Mataʻafa

Events 
Ongoing – COVID-19 pandemic in Samoa

 22 January – Samoa Prime Minister Fiamē Naomi Mataʻafa announces a three day lockdown in response to ten positive COVID-19 passengers from a repatriation flight.
 22 April – Samoa reports five community spread COVID-19 cases on Manono Island, which had been free of the virus until now.
 27 July – Prime Minister Fiamē Naomi Mataʻafa ends Samoa's state of emergency after two years. 
 23 August – Tuimalealiʻifano Vaʻaletoʻa Sualauvi II is re-elected by the Parliament for a second term as O le Ao o le Malo, the Samoan head of state.

Deaths 

 January 17 – Va'ai Papu Vailupe, 77, politician
 February 24 – Va'aiga Tuigamala, 52, rugby player
 March 25 – Va'ele Pa'ia'aua Iona Sekuini, 58, politician
 May 6 – Kelly Meafua, 31, politician
 August 2 – Jack Netzler, 82, politician

References 

 
2020s in Samoa
Years of the 21st century in Samoa
Samoa
Samoa